Nikola Tesla (1856–1943) was a Serbian-American electrical engineer and inventor. 

Nikola Tesla may also refer to:

Belgrade Nikola Tesla Airport, an airport in Belgrade, Serbia
Nikola Tesla Museum, a science museum in Belgrade
Nikola Tesla (Niška Banja), a village in Niška Banja, Serbia
TPP Nikola Tesla, a power plant in Serbia
Nikola Tesla Satellite Award, a Satellite Award from the International Press Academy
Nikola Tesla (Sanctuary), a fictional character in Sanctuary
The Secret of Nikola Tesla, a biographical film of 1980

See also
 
 
 List of things named after Nikola Tesla
 Nikola Tesla in popular culture
 Ericsson Nikola Tesla, a Croatian company
 Tesla (disambiguation)